The Pernambuco foliage-gleaner (Automolus lammi) is a species of bird in the family Furnariidae. It is found in forests of north-eastern Brazil. Until recently, it was considered a subspecies of the white-eyed foliage-gleaner. The morphology of the two is very similar, but their voices differ significantly. The Pernambuco foliage-gleaner is restricted to a region with extensive habitat destruction, and is considered vulnerable by BirdLife International.

References

 Zimmer, K. J. (2008). The White-eyed Foliage-gleaner (Furnariidae: Automolus) is two species. Wilson Journal of Ornithology 120: 10–25.

Pernambuco foliage-gleaner
Birds of the Atlantic Forest
Pernambuco foliage-gleaner